The 2001 Heineken Open was a tennis tournament played on outdoor hard courts at the ASB Tennis Centre in Auckland in New Zealand and was part of the International Series of the 2001 ATP Tour. The tournament ran from 8 January through 15 January 2001. Second-seeded Dominik Hrbatý won the singles title.

Finals

Singles

 Dominik Hrbatý defeated  Francisco Clavet 6–4, 2–6, 6–3
 It was Hrbatý's 1st title of the year and the 4th of his career.

Doubles

 Marius Barnard /  Jim Thomas defeated  David Adams /  Martín García 7–6(12–10), 6–4
 It was Barnard's only title of the year and the 6th of his career. It was Thomas's only title of the year and the 1st of his career.

References

External links
 
 ATP – tournament profile
 ITF – tournament edition details
 Singles draw
 Doubles draw

 
Heineken Open
Heineken Open
ATP Auckland Open
January 2001 sports events in New Zealand